Femeia visurilor is a 2005 Romanian film directed by Dan Pița and starring Dan Condurache and Răzvan Vasilescu.

Cast
Dan Condurache as Thomas Alexandru 
Răzvan Vasilescu as Nene 
Adrian Pintea as Dr. Antim 
Catalina Mustata as Noa 
Claudiu Bleonț as Fabian 
Eugen Cristea   
Florin Zamfirescu as Cratofil 
Ilinca Goia as Mania 
Irina Movila as Vanda 
Marius Bodochi as Caius 
Olga Tudorache as Mother 
Vladimir Gaitan as The ophthalmologist 
Gabriela Bobes

External links

Femeia visurilor la Cinemagia.ro

References 

Films directed by Dan Pița
2005 drama films
2005 films
Romanian drama films